"Almost (Sweet Music)"  is a song recorded by Irish singer-songwriter Hozier for his second studio album, Wasteland, Baby! It was released on 16 January 2019 as the third single from the record, peaking at number eight on the Irish Singles Chart.

Writing and composition

"Almost (Sweet Music)" is the second track on the album, written by Hozier alone. "Almost (Sweet Music)" is a folk song with handclaps, "honey-rich" vocals, and gospel choral backing. The lyrics tell a story by paying homage to artists of jazz tradition, including Duke Ellington and John Coltrane, asking "do I owe each kiss to lip and cheek/as soft as Chet can sing"? 

The track also "provides a glimpse into his personal journey between the two full-length studio albums" with vocals of both jubilation and exhaustion.
On the song, Hozier stated that "since the song references music so much and is about the experience of listening to music, the concept of this video is kind of drawing from the jazz tradition and just a lot of musicians and a lot of dancers whose disciplines stem from that tradition.”

Critical reception
The song received generally positive reviews. The Irish Times stated that "the melody is lifted by a multi-voiced choir bursting straight out of the Pearly Gates" and The Arts Desk states that "the verse is beautifully mumbled and the whole lot just sways", comparing it to a Van Morrison track. PopMatters concluded that the song captured "deep personal sentiment" and illustrated the "fullness and richness of Hozier's timbre" while Rolling Stone dismissed track among "songs that pile on folksy handclaps and [..] gospel choirs in the hopes of landing on a-coffeehouse  playlist."

Commercial performance
The song peaked at number six on the Billboard Rock Digital Sales Chart and number eight on the Irish Singles Chart. The song was certified silver in the UK. Billboard described the track as a "love letter to jazz" and a "a bright and cheery homage to the "sweet music" that shaped his growth as a songwriter."

Music video
The official music video for "Almost (Sweet Music)" was released on 16 April 2019. The video was directed by Blythe Thomas  and stars dancers Cameron Boyce and Christine Flores.  It intertwines footage of Hozier playing guitar in an empty warehouse with performers interpretive dancing to a "rhythm that works in every environment, from a raucous house party to [..] a cellist practicing in a cozy library." The video has garnered over 12 million views on YouTube.

Personnel
Credits adapted from Tidal.
 A. Hozier-Byrne – Producer, composer, lyricist, associated performer, clapping, electric guitar, percussion, piano, shaker, vocalist
 Markus Dravs – Producer, associated performer, vocal producer
 Alex Ryan – Associated Performer, bass (vocal), clapping, percussion, wurlitzer organ
 Booker T. Jones – Associated Performer, organ
 Paul Clarvis – Associated Performer, tambourine
 Rory Doyle – Associated Performer, clapping, drums, percussion
 Nathaniel Graham – Asst. Recording Engineer
 Robbie Nelson – Asst. Recording Engineer, studio personnel
 Iain Berryman – Engineer, studio personnel
 Greg Calbi – Mastering Engineer, studio personnel
 Ivan Wayman – Mix Engineer, studio personnel
 Shawn Everett – Mixer, studio personnel

Charts

Weekly charts

Year-end charts

Certifications

References

2019 songs
2019 singles
Hozier (musician) songs
Songs written by Hozier (musician)